Dame Shirley Veronica Bassey  (born 8 January 1937) is a Welsh singer. Best known for her career longevity, powerful voice and recording the theme songs to three James Bond films, Bassey is widely regarded as one of the most popular vocalists in Britain.

Born in Cardiff, Bassey began performing as a teenager in 1953. In 1959, she became the first Welsh person to gain a number-one single on the UK Singles Chart. In the following decades, Bassey amassed 27 Top 40 hits in the UK, including two number-ones. She became well-known for recording the soundtrack theme songs of the James Bond films Goldfinger (1964), Diamonds Are Forever (1971), and Moonraker (1979). In 2020, Bassey became the first female artist to chart an album in the Top 40 of the UK Albums Chart in seven consecutive decades with her album I Owe It All To You.

Bassey has also had numerous BBC television specials, and she hosted her own variety series, Shirley Bassey. In 2011, BBC aired the television film Shirley, based on Bassey's life and career. Since making her first appearance at the Royal Albert Hall in 1971, she has performed at the venue 45 times.

Bassey received the first award for Best British Female Solo Artist at the 1st Brit Awards in 1977. She was appointed a Dame in 1999 for services to the performing arts. In 2003, she was ranked among the "100 Great Black Britons". Her song "Goldfinger" was inducted into the Grammy Hall of Fame in 2008. She has influenced many other singers, including Aretha Franklin.

Early life
Shirley Veronica Bassey was born the sixth and youngest child of Henry Bassey and Eliza Jane Start on Bute Street in Tiger Bay, Cardiff. She grew up in the nearby community of Splott. Her father was Nigerian, and her mother came from New Marske, North Yorkshire.

Two of her mother's four children from previous relationships lived in the Bassey household. Bassey's mother listed her first husband, Alfred Metcalfe, as her own father in the registry of her marriage to Henry Bassey, giving rise to speculation that this marriage was bigamous in the absence of a prior divorce. Eliza and Henry's second child died in infancy, so Shirley was born into a household of three sisters, two half-sisters, and one brother.

Teachers and students alike at Moorland Road School noticed Bassey's strong voice, but gave the pre-teen little encouragement: "everyone told me to shut up. Even in the school choir the teacher kept telling me to back off till I was singing in the corridor!" A classmate recalled her singing the refrain "Can't Help Lovin' Dat Man" from Show Boat with such feeling that she made their teacher uncomfortable. She left Splott secondary modern school at age 14 to work at Curran Steels and, in the evenings and weekends, to sing in local pubs and clubs.

Career

1953–1959: Career beginnings
In 1953, Bassey signed her first professional contract, touring with the variety show Memories of Jolson, a musical based on the life of Al Jolson. On 17 December 1953, Bassey signed a contract with Columbia Productions for two performances at the salary of £10. Her next professional engagement was in the touring show Hot from Harlem, in which she and other mixed-race Cardiff performers were passed off as Black Americans in 1954.  A review of the show in March 1954 included: "Shirley Bassey, an attractive young singer, is an asset to the show." Later that year, Bassey gave birth to her daughter Sharon, while staying with her sister Ella in London.

While performing in Jersey, Bassey met her first manager, Mike Sullivan. In 1955, Bassey toured various theatres until she was noticed by the impresario Jack Hylton at the Astor Club in September 1955. He invited her to feature in Al Read's Such Is Life which opened on 14 December 1955 at the Adelphi Theatre in London's West End. In the show, which ran until 3 November 1956, she featured the song "Burn My Candle", leading one reviewer to say that she had nearly stopped the show with the song "which brought outraged mutters, then roars of shamefaced applause." During the show's run, Philips record producer Johnny Franz spotted her on television, was impressed, and offered her a recording deal. Bassey recorded her first single, "Burn My Candle", the song she had featured in "Such Is Life", and this was released in February 1956. The cabaret-style song was banned by the BBC because the lyrics were considered too suggestive. More singles followed, and in February 1957, Bassey had her first hit with "The Banana Boat Song", which reached No. 8 in the UK Singles Chart.

Following a successful run at the Café de Paris, London, she made her American stage début in Las Vegas at El Rancho Vegas in February 1957. Following on from Las Vegas, Bassey opened at Ciro's on Sunset Boulevard in West Hollywood on 15 February 1957. She also recorded under the direction of American producer Mitch Miller in New York City for the Columbia Records label (which at the time had a distribution deal with Philips), producing the single "If I Had a Needle and Thread" b/w "Tonight My Heart She Is Crying". On her return to the UK in April 1957, she starred in "Sunday Night at the London Palladium" for the first time on 28 April 1957.

In mid-1958, Bassey recorded two singles that would become classics in the Bassey catalogue. "As I Love You" was released as the B-side of another ballad, "Hands Across the Sea"; it did not sell well at first but, after another appearance at the London Palladium on 30 November, sales began to pick up. In January 1959, "As I Love You" reached number-one and stayed there for four weeks; it was the first number-one single by a Welsh artist. While "As I Love You" climbed the charts, so did Bassey's recording of "Kiss Me, Honey Honey, Kiss Me" and both records would end up occupying the top 3 at the same time. A few months later, Bassey signed to EMI's Columbia label and released the album The Fabulous Shirley Bassey. The album reached No. 12 on the UK Albums chart.

1960–1979: Success and breakthrough
Between 1960 and 1961, Bassey had four Top 10 hits in the UK. Her 1960 recording of "As Long As He Needs Me" from Lionel Bart's Oliver! peaked at No. 2, and had a chart run of 30 weeks. She made her American television début on 13 November 1960, when she performed on The Ed Sullivan Show. In 1961, the double A-side "Reach for the Stars"/"Climb Ev'ry Mountain" reached number-one. Bassey's version of "As Long as He Needs Me" reached No. 2. Her single "I'll Get By" peaked at No. 10. Bassey's rendition of "You'll Never Know" was one of England's top hits in 1961, reaching No. 6 on the charts.  She began to gain recognition in the American market and signed to United Artists Records in August 1961. The following month she began a five-week engagement at the Persian Room inside New York's Plaza Hotel

Bassey's collaboration with Nelson Riddle and his orchestra, the album Let's Face the Music (1962), reached No. 12 in the UK album chart; and the single, "What Now My Love" made it to No. 5 in 1962. Her cover version of the Ben E. King hit "I (Who Have Nothing)" reached No. 6 in 1963. In January 1963, Bassey performed at a gala commemorating the second anniversary of President John F. Kennedy's inauguration in Washington, D.C. In March 1963, she appeared on the cover of Ebony magazine. Bassey made her Carnegie Hall debut on 15 February 1964. The complete concert recording was not released until it was included in the EMI compilation The EMU/UA Years 1959–1979 in 1994.

In 1965, Bassey enjoyed her only Top 40 hit on the Billboard Hot 100 with the title song of the James Bond film, Goldfinger. The single "Goldfinger" was released in the US in January 1965, peaking at No 8. The original soundtrack for Goldfinger hit number-one in the US that year. The "Goldfinger" theme song,  had a lasting impact on her career. In the sleeve notes for Bassey's 25th Anniversary Album (1978), Peter Clayton noted that: "Acceptance in America was considerably helped by the enormous popularity of ("Goldfinger")...But she had actually established herself there as early as 1961, in cabaret in New York. She was also a success in Las Vegas...'I suppose I should feel hurt that I've never been really big in America on record since "Goldfinger"...But, concertwise, I always sell out.'..."

Her live 1965 album Shirley Bassey at the Pigalle, recorded during a sold-out run at the Pigalle in London, peaked at No. 15 on the UK album chart. Also in 1965, she sang the title song for the James Bond spoof The Liquidator. Bassey recorded a song for the next Bond film, Thunderball (1965). "Mr Kiss Kiss Bang Bang" was not used in the movie, although the film's score follows its melodic theme. Written by John Barry and Leslie Bricusse, "Mr Kiss Kiss Bang Bang" was re-recorded by American singer Dionne Warwick, and then rejected in favor of a new song, "Thunderball", hastily written by Barry and given to Welsh singer Tom Jones after the film's producers decided the song over the opening credits must feature the film's title.

In the aftermath of "Goldfinger" her UK sales started to falter as well: only two of her singles would enter the UK top 40 from 1966 to 1970. Her first album on United Artists, "I've Got a Song for You" (1966), spent one week on the chart. From 1966 to 1970, only two albums would chart, one of those a compilation. One of her best-known singles, "Big Spender" was released in 1967, charting just short of the UK top 20.

Bassey began to live as a tax exile in 1968 and was unable to work in Britain for almost two years. In 1969, she appeared in NBC's The Spring Thing, a musical television special hosted by Bobbie Gentry and Noel Harrison. Guests included were Goldie Hawn, Meredith MacRae, Irwin C. Watson, Rod McKuen, and Harpers Bizarre.

Bassey's UK comeback came in 1970 leading to one of the most successful periods of her career. Starting the year with a BBC Television 'Special', The Young Generation Meet Shirley Bassey, recorded in Sweden and shown on BBC1 on 18 March. She returned to the UK with a record-breaking run of performances at the Talk of the Town nightclub. Also that year, her album Something was released, and showcased a new Bassey style, a shift from traditional pop to more contemporary songs and arrangements (the eponymous single was more successful in the UK charts than the original recording by The Beatles) – although Bassey would never completely abandon that which had been her forte: standards, show tunes, and torch songs.

Her song "Something" was also a top 10 US hit on the Adult Contemporary chart. Other singles of this period included the hit "Never Never Never", an English version of the Italian "Grande grande grande", reaching the top 10 in the US Adult Contemporary Chart, the UK top 10 and number one in Australia and South Africa.

Returning to the James Bond franchise, she recorded the theme song for Diamonds Are Forever (1971). Bassey appeared on the Morecambe and Wise Christmas Show, broadcast on Christmas Day in 1971.

Bassey was the subject of This Is Your Life on two occasions: firstly, in November 1972 when she was surprised by Eamonn Andrews at Heathrow Airport, and then in January 1993, when Michael Aspel surprised her at the curtain call of a sell-out concert at the Royal Albert Hall.

Bassey recorded a series of successful albums on the United Artists label, including: Something Else (1971); And I Love You So (1972); I Capricorn (1972); Never Never Never (1973); Good, Bad but Beautiful (1975); Love, Life and Feelings (1976); You Take My Heart Away (1977) and Yesterdays (1978). Additionally, two of Bassey's earlier LPs also entered the charts in the '70s: And We Were Lovers (1967, re-issued as Big Spender), and Let's Face the Music (1962, re-issued as What Now My Love). Two compilations, The Shirley Bassey Singles Album (1975) and 25th Anniversary Album (1978), both made the top three of the UK charts: The Shirley Bassey Singles Album, her highest-charting album, reached number two and earned a gold disc, and the 25th Anniversary Album eventually went platinum.

Between 1970 and 1979, Bassey had 18 hit albums in the UK Albums Chart. Her album The Magic Is You (1979) featured a portrait by the photographer Francesco Scavullo. In 1973, her sold-out concerts at New York's Carnegie Hall were recorded and released as a two-LP set, Shirley Bassey: Live at Carnegie Hall; this album reached No. 20 on the Billboard R&B album chart.

In 1976, Bassey starred in the six-episode Shirley Bassey show, the first of her television programmes for the BBC, followed by a second series of six episodes in 1979. The final show of the first series was nominated for the Golden Rose of Montreux in 1977. The series featured guests including Neil Diamond, Michel Legrand, The Three Degrees and Dusty Springfield and featured Bassey in various international locations as well as in the television studio. In 1978, Bassey pleaded guilty to being drunk and disorderly "after shouting abuse in the street and pushing a policeman". In 1979, Bassey recorded the title theme song for the Bond film, Moonraker.

1980–1999: Semi-retirement and continued success
Throughout most of the 1980s, Bassey focused on charitable work and performing occasional concert tours throughout Europe, Australia, and the United States. She had ended her contract with United Artists, whose former record division was now part of EMI, and began what she referred to as "semi-retirement". Bassey recorded an album entitled All by Myself (1982) and made a TV special for Thames Television called A Special Lady with guest Robert Goulet. Around this time she recorded a duet with the French film actor Alain Delon, "Thought I'd Ring You" (1983). Bassey was now recording far less often but an album of her most famous songs, I Am What I Am (1984), was recorded with the London Symphony Orchestra (LSO) conducted by Carl Davis. This was followed by a single and video to support the London Tourist Board, "There's No Place Like London" (1986), which was co-written by Lynsey de Paul and Gerard Kenny. She recorded an album of James Bond themes, The Bond Collection in 1987, but was apparently unhappy with the results so she declined to release it. (Five years later it was released anyway, Bassey sued in court, and all unsold copies were withdrawn.)

Bassey provided vocals for Swiss artists Yello on "The Rhythm Divine" (1987), a song co-written by Scottish singer Billy Mackenzie. An album sung entirely in Spanish, La Mujer was released in 1989. In the latter mid-1980s Bassey had started working with a vocal coach, a former opera singer, and her album Keep the Music Playing (1991) displayed a grand, operatic pop style on several songs (perhaps also influenced by her album with the LSO seven years earlier).

EMI released the five-CD box set Bassey – The EMI/UA Years 1959–1979 in 1994. The accompanying booklet opened with a poem by Marc Almond. Bassey collaborated with Chris Rea in the film La Passione (1996), appearing in the film as herself and releasing the single "'Disco' La Passione". The remix of this single charted just outside the UK top 40. Bassey's "History Repeating" (1997), written for her by the Propellerheads, reached number one on the UK Dance Chart, and number 10 on the US Dance Chart. The liner notes of the Propellerheads' album Decksandrumsandrockandroll included the lines: "We would like to extend our maximum respect to Shirley Bassey for honouring us with her performance. We are still in shock...." Bassey celebrated her 60th birthday in 1997 with two open-air concerts, at Castle Howard and Althorp Park, and another TV special. The resulting live album The Birthday Concert received a Grammy Award nomination for Best Traditional Pop Vocal Performance. On 7 October 1998 in Egypt, Bassey performed for a benefit at an open-air concert close to the Sphinx and the Great Pyramid. Bassey played the Friday night at Henley Festival in 1984.

Bassey was sued in a breach of contract case in 1998 by her former personal assistant, who also accused Bassey of hitting her and making an ethnic slur. Bassey won the case. The episode was lampooned by Alexander Baron in his one-act play The Trial of Shirley Bassey. The following year, she performed the official song for the rugby World Cup, "World in Union", with Bryn Terfel at the opening ceremony at The Millennium Stadium, Cardiff, wearing a gown based on the Welsh flag. Their single made the top 40, and Bassey contributed two more songs to the official album Land of My Fathers, which reached number one on the UK compilations chart, and went silver.

2000–present: High-profile performances and final album

Throughout the 2000s and 2010s, Bassey continued to perform at various high profile events. In 2001, she was principal artiste at the Duke of Edinburgh's 80th birthday celebration. On 3 June 2002, she was one of a line-up of artists including Elton John, Paul McCartney and Tom Jones who performed at the Queen's 50th Jubilee Party at Buckingham Palace.

Bassey celebrated 50 years in show business in 2003 with the release of the CD Thank You for the Years, which was another top 20 album. A gala charity auction of her stage costumes at Christie's, "Dame Shirley Bassey: 50 Years of Glittering Gowns", raised £250,000 (US$500,000) for the Dame Shirley Bassey Scholarship at the Royal Welsh College of Music and Drama and the Noah's Ark Children's Hospital Appeal. Bassey topped the bill at the 2005 Royal Variety Performance, introducing her new song "The Living Tree".

Two popular Audiences with Shirley Bassey have aired on British television, one in 1995 that attracted more than 10 million viewers in the UK, with the second broadcast in 2006. Bassey returned to perform in five arenas around the UK in June the same year, culminating at Wembley. She also performed a concert in front of 10,000 people at the Bryn Terfel Faenol Festival in North Wales broadcast by BBC Wales. Marks & Spencer signed her for their Christmas 2006 James Bond–style television advertising campaign. Bassey is seen in a glamorous ice palace singing a cover version of Pink's song "Get the Party Started", wearing an M&S gown.

"The Living Tree", written, produced, and originally recorded by the group Never the Bride, was released as a single on 23 April 2007, marking Bassey's 50th anniversary in the UK Singles Chart – and the record for the longest span of top-40 hits in UK chart history. Bassey performed a 45-minute set at the 2007 Glastonbury Festival wearing a pink Julien Macdonald dress, and customised Wellington boots. A new album, Get the Party Started, was subsequently released on 25 June 2007 and entered the UK Albums Chart at number six. The single of the title song reached number 3 on the US Dance Chart. The same year, Bassey performed "Big Spender" with Elton John at his annual White Tie and Tiara Ball to raise money for The Elton John AIDS Foundation. In 2007, Bassey performed in Fashion Rocks in aid of The Prince's Trust at the Royal Albert Hall.

Bassey was rushed to hospital in Monaco on 23 May 2008 to have an emergency operation on her stomach after complaining of abdominal pains. She was forced to pull out of the Nelson Mandela 90th Birthday Tribute concert because of her illness. A biography of Bassey, Diamond Diva, was published in 2008.

Bassey recorded the album The Performance (2009), with James Bond composer David Arnold as producer. A number of artists wrote songs expressly for her, including Manic Street Preachers, Gary Barlow, Tom Baxter, KT Tunstall, Pet Shop Boys, Nick Hodgson of the Kaiser Chiefs, John Barry and Don Black. Bassey headlined at the BBC Electric Proms on 23 October 2009, in her only full live set of 2009. She performed several of the new songs from The Performance in November 2009 on various TV shows: The Graham Norton Show, The Paul O'Grady Show and as the guest singer on Strictly Come Dancing.

Bassey performed at a gala celebrating the 80th birthday of Mikhail Gorbachev on 30 March 2011. She also performed at the Classical Brit Awards in 2011, singing "Goldfinger" in tribute to John Barry.

The BBC broadcast a 70-minute drama entitled Shirley on 29 September 2011, depicting Bassey's early life and career. Ruth Negga played the title role. Bassey was one of the line-up of artists on 4 June 2012 who performed at the Queen's 60th Jubilee Party at Buckingham Palace, singing "Diamonds Are Forever". She performed at the 2013 Academy Awards on 24 February 2013 to commemorate the 50th anniversary of the James Bond movie franchise. It was her first appearance at an Oscars ceremony as a performer. She sang "Goldfinger" to a standing ovation.

Bassey performed "I'm Still Here" and "The Lady Is A Tramp" on 13 November 2014 at the Royal Variety Performance in the presence of The Duke and Duchess of Cambridge.

Bassey released another album, Hello Like Before, on 17 November 2014. It includes a 50th-anniversary re-recording of "Goldfinger" (recreating the original orchestration) and a duet of "Diamonds Are a Girl's Best Friend" with Paloma Faith, produced and conducted by Stuart Barr.

In December 2016, Bassey starred in a 60-minute BBC broadcast hosted by David Walliams.

On 11 March 2018, Bassey performed "Almost Like Being In Love" in a tribute to Sir Bruce Forsyth at the London Palladium. At a gala for AMFAR (The Foundation for Aids Research) in Los Angeles on 18 October 2018, Bassey sang "Goldfinger", "Diamonds Are Forever", "Almost Like Being In Love" and "I Am What I Am".

On 9 August 2019, Bassey performed at UNICEF's Summer Gala in Porto Cervo, Sardinia, singing "Goldfinger", "Diamonds Are Forever" and "S'Wonderful". Bassey appeared on the Ball &  Boe TV Christmas Special on Friday 20 December 2019, singing "Have Yourself a Merry Little Christmas" with Michael Ball and Alfie Boe.

In 2020, with the release of her most recent album, I Owe It All To You, Bassey became the first female artist to chart an album in the top 40 of the UK Albums Chart in seven consecutive decades.

On 4 October 2022, Bassey performed in "The Sound of 007: Live from the Royal Albert Hall", which commemorated the 60th Anniversary of the James Bond Film era.  She sang the two opening songs, "Diamonds are forever" and "Goldfinger".

Personal life

Marriages
Bassey's first marriage was to Kenneth Hume in 1961. The couple separated in 1964 and divorced in 1965 in the wake of Bassey's affair with actor Peter Finch. She then announced to the press that she and Finch would not be marrying, telling the press: "It simply wouldn't work out. Just know I am not ready for marriage to anyone. I feel I have to be free." A year later, Hume sued Finch and another man, John McAuliffe, for being "indiscreet" with Bassey. Both Finch and McAuliffe were cited as co-respondents in the Hume–Bassey divorce. For her part, Bassey was named as co-respondent in 1965 when Finch's wife, South African actress Yolande Turner, divorced him.

From 1968 until they divorced in 1979, Bassey was married to Sergio Novak, the assistant manager of the Excelsior Hotel in Venice. During this time, Novak was Bassey's manager, and they adopted Mark, her grand-nephew.

Children
The fathers of Bassey's two daughters, Sharon Bassey (a.k.a. Sharon Novak, born 1954) and Samantha Bassey (a.k.a. Samantha Novak, born 1963), are unknown. Bassey had Sharon at the age of 17 and her sister Ella raised her as her own daughter until the 1960s. Bassey's first husband suggested that Samantha, born during the couple's marriage, was the result of an affair between Bassey and Peter Finch.

In 1985, Samantha, age 21, was found dead in the River Avon in Bristol, England. Bassey has always maintained that the death of her daughter was not a suicide. On 24 March 2010, Avon and Somerset Police confirmed they were undertaking fresh inquiries into the death and specifically claims that the convicted killer Michael Moffat was involved in her death. However, in October 2010 it was reported that the investigation came to an end and concluded that there "is no evidence of any criminal act involved" in Novak's death. The ordeal of losing her daughter caused Bassey to temporarily lose her voice.

In a 2009 interview, Bassey stated that she and her son, Mark, had reconciled. Bassey has four grandsons through her surviving daughter, Sharon Novak. Bassey resides in Monaco.

In 2018, Bassey reported that she had a great-granddaughter.

Accolades
In 1994, Bassey became a Commander of the Order of the British Empire (CBE). She was made a Dame Commander of the Order of the British Empire (DBE) on 31 December 1999 by Queen Elizabeth II for services to entertainment. She was invited to perform in 2002 at the Party at the Palace, a public celebration of the Queen's Golden Jubilee. Bassey also performed at the Queen's Diamond Jubilee concert at Buckingham Palace on 4 June 2012, singing "Diamonds Are Forever". She was invited to perform at the Queen's 90th Birthday celebrations at Windsor Castle on 15 May 2016.

In 2012, Bassey was among the British cultural icons selected by artist Sir Peter Blake to appear in a new version of his most famous artwork – the Beatles' Sgt. Pepper's Lonely Hearts Club Band album cover – to celebrate the British cultural figures of his life that he most admires. In 2016, she was named as one of "the 50 greatest Welsh men and women of all time".

In November 2016 the Royal Welsh College of Music and Drama announced the naming of the Shirley Bassey Studio in celebration of Bassey's long-standing support for young Welsh singers studying at the College. She was awarded a Knight in France's Legion of Honour in 2003, to signify her popularity and importance in the culture of France. Bassey was awarded the freedom of her hometown, Cardiff, in a ceremony at City Hall on 17 May 2019.

Bassey has also received the following honors:

 1993: Honorary Fellowship of the Royal Welsh College of Music and Drama
 
 1999: Madam Tussaud's waxwork unveiled in London (second model in Las Vegas)
 2004: Ranked No. 8 on the list of "100 Great Black Britons"
 2005: Avenue of Stars – plaque unveiled in London
2018: She unveiled a carriage on the Snowdon Mountain Railway, named in her honour
2019: Freedom of the City of Cardiff
2019: Square of Fame – plaque of Bassey's handprints unveiled at the SSE Arena, Wembley Park, London
2020: Official UK Chart Record – First female artist to claim a top 40 album in seven consecutive decades

Awards and nominations 
Grammy Awards

|-
| 1999
| The Birthday Concert
| Best Traditional Pop Vocal Album
| 
|-
| 2008
| "Goldfinger"
| Grammy Hall of Fame (Single)
| 

NME Awards
|-
| 1959
| Shirley Bassey
| Favorite British Singer
| 
|-
| 1960
| Shirley Bassey
| Favorite British Singer
| 

Bassey has also received the following awards and nominations:

2014: Lifetime Achievement Award – World Music Awards

Discography

Television specials

Bibliography
 "Shirley Bassey: Diamonds Are Forever" – Mary Long (2017)
 Miss Shirley Bassey – John L. Williams (2010) – London: Quercus. 
 Shirley Bassey: Diamond Diva – Peter Hogan (2008)
 Cardiff: Rebirth of a Capital (Foreword by Shirley Bassey) – Ungersma, Hurn (2005)
 Shirley Bassey: Welsh History Stories – Evans, Stokes, ap Emlyn, ap Emlyn (2003)
 Shirley Bassey: An appreciation – Muriel Burgess (1998, reprinted 1999)
 My Life on Record and in Concert – Shirley Bassey (Bloomsbury, 1998)
 The Trial of Shirley Bassey – A Play in One Act – Alexander Baron (1998)
 Shirley Bassey: This Is My Life (Piano/vocal/guitar) – Sheet music book
 Shirley Bassey: You're the Voice (Piano/vocal/guitar) – Sheet music book
 Guinness Book of British Hit Singles – 14th Edition – 
 Guinness Book of British Hit Singles – 16th Edition – 
 Guinness Book of British Hit Albums – 7th Edition – 
 The Book of Golden Discs – 2nd Edition – 
 The Guinness Book of 500 Number One Hits –

See also
 List of best-selling music artists

References

See also

 Legion of Honour
 Legion of Honour Museum 
 List of Legion of Honour recipients by name (B)
 List of foreign recipients of Legion of Honour by name
 List of foreign recipients of the Legion of Honour by country
 List of foreign recipients of the Legion of Honour by decade

External links

 Dame Shirley Bassey – Official Facebook Page
 Shirley Bassey discography at Discogs
 
 Shirleybassey.nl – extensive CD discography with track lists
 The Songs of Shirley Bassey (archived site)
 Shirley Bassey biography on BBC Wales
 

1937 births
Living people
20th-century Black British women singers
21st-century Black British women singers
Traditional pop music singers
Torch singers
Welsh pop singers
Brit Award winners
Dames Commander of the Order of the British Empire
Chevaliers of the Légion d'honneur
Singers awarded knighthoods
People from Butetown
British expatriates in Monaco
Welsh people of English descent
Welsh people of Nigerian descent
People of Efik descent
20th-century Welsh women singers
21st-century Welsh women singers
Columbia Graphophone Company artists
Philips Records artists
Decca Records artists
United Artists Records artists
Geffen Records artists